Dunbar Island is part of the West Point Island Group of the Falkland Islands. It is near West Falkland, to its north, in Byron Sound. It is east of Carcass Island and Low Island and to the west of Saunders Island. It is south of Sedge Island and north of the Byron Heights and Storm Mountain.

References

Islands of the Falkland Islands